Mazsalaca is a town in Valmiera Municipality in the Vidzeme region of Latvia. It has 1269 inhabitants.

History
The area includes the largest known Stone Age burial site in Northern Europe and was first settled ca. 5000 BC. The present town began to develop in 1864, when a bridge over the Salaca river was constructed.

During World War II, Mazsalaca was under German occupation from 4 July 1941 until 25 September 1944. It was administered as a part of the Generalbezirk Lettland of Reichskommissariat Ostland.

In October 2009 a meteorite crater was found near the town, which later turned out to be hoax as part of marketing campaign of telecommunication company Tele2.

People
People who were born, lived in Mazsalaca:

 Gustavs Ērenpreiss (1891 - 1956) - bicycle master
 Augusts Kirhenšteins (1876 - 1963) - microbiologist and educator
 Valters Hirte (1913 - 1983) - craftsman
 Ansis Epners (1937 - 2003) - film director
 Oskars Perro (1918 - 2003) - soldier and writer

See also
List of cities in Latvia

References

External links

 Mazsalaca Municipality portal

 
Towns in Latvia
1928 establishments in Latvia
Populated places established in 1928
Valmiera Municipality
Kreis Wolmar
Vidzeme